Pickering Nunatak is a prominent nunatak at the east side of the mouth of Lambert Glacier, situated 20 nautical miles (37 km) south-southwest of Manning Nunataks. Sighted on a flight by an ANARE (Australian National Antarctic Research Expeditions) Beaver aircraft over the Amery Ice Shelf on November 2, 1957. Named by Antarctic Names Committee of Australia (ANCA) for Flight Sgt. R. Pickering of the RAAF Antarctic Flight at Mawson Station, 1957.

Further reading 
 Yu, J., H. Liu, K. C. Jezek, R. C. Warner, and J. Wen (2010), Analysis of velocity field, mass balance, and basal melt of the Lambert Glacier–Amery Ice Shelf system by incorporating Radarsat SAR interferometry and ICESat laser altimetry measurements, J. Geophys. Res., 115, B11102, doi:10.1029/2010JB007456

References 

Nunataks of Mac. Robertson Land